The 11th Golden Bell Awards was held on 26 March 1975 at the Armed Forces Cultural Center in Taipei, Taiwan. The ceremony was hosted by Fredrick Chien.

Winners

References

1975
1975 in Taiwan